Jorge Adolfo Páez (born October 27, 1965) is a Mexican actor, circus performer and former professional boxer. In boxing he held the WBO and IBF featherweight titles. Paez's nickname of "El Maromero" is in honor of the somersault (referred to in Spanish as "maroma") acts he performs at the circus. It was in the circus that he learned acrobatic moves he would later use in the boxing ring. Páez is also the father of Azriel Páez, Jorge Páez Jr., and Airam Páez.

Personal life
Paez has been a circus performer in his northwest Mexico hometown since he was very young. Jorge started boxing in San Luis Río Colorado. He is also the father of welterweight prospect Azriel Páez and WBC Youth Intercontinental welterweight champion Jorge Páez Jr.

Professional career

Early years
Paez began boxing professionally on November 16, 1984, knocking out Efren Treno in three rounds.

Featherweight champion
From there on, he built a string of wins that led him to challenge IBF featherweight champion Calvin Grove in boxing's last 15 round world title fight. Paez was trailing on all three scorecards, but dropped the champion three times in the last round. The knockdowns provided an edge on the scorecards, making Paez IBF featherweight champion by a unanimous decision. He defended the title eight times, including a knockout in 11 against Grove in a rematch, a unanimous decision win former world champion Stevie Cruz and a split decision against future world champion Troy Dorsey.

He then won the WBO featherweight title in a unification bout against Louie Espinoza (in a rematch of their 1989 fight that ended in a draw) by split decision.

Paez then vacated his titles and moved up in weight, only to lose to IBF super featherweight champion Tony Lopez. Paez continued to fight, but he had mixed results versus former world champion Lupe Suarez and against Tracy Spann; he and Suarez drew in 10 rounds, and he beat Spann by a 10-round decision.

Lightweight

On October 10, 1991, Paez moved up to lightweight and fought against Pernell Whitaker for the WBC, WBA and IBF lightweight titles but lost by unanimous decision.

On November 6, 1992, Paez fought against future world champion Rafael Ruelas for the NABF lightweight title, losing by TKO in the 10 round. On July 17, 1993, he lost to Freddie Pendleton by a decision in twelve for the IBF lightweight title

On July 29, 1994, he was given a shot at the vacant WBO lightweight title against rising superstar Oscar De La Hoya. Paez lost by a knockout in round two.

Later Years
Paez then went up against WBA super featherweight champion Genaro Hernandez in a non-title bout, losing by TKO in the 8th round due to cuts. On August 17, 1996, he won the WBC Continental Americas super featherweight regional title by knocking out Narciso Valenzuela in 3 rounds. Paez would then lose that title in his next match against Julian Wheeler but regained it by beating Wheeler in the rematch.

On August 7, 1997, he lost by a knockout in eight rounds to Angel Manfredy. After three victories, Paez lost via a devastating one-punch knockout in seven rounds  to Augie Sanchez in May 1999. In his next bout in October 1999, Paez boxed future lightweight champion Jose Luis Castillo, losing by KO in the fifth round.

Paez continued to box on over the next few years, winning a long string of bouts against a lower level of opposition.

Injuries and Retirement
Paez was supposed to fight Jesús Chávez on March 29, 2003. However, it was discovered that Paez suffered from brain swelling, putting the fight with Jesús Chávez and his career in serious jeopardy. Despite these findings, Paez fought on, and on December 5, 2003, in Phoenix, Arizona, he defeated Scott McCraken by a ten-round split decision in what would be Paez's final match.

His overall record was 79-14-5 (51 KOs).

Professional boxing record

Outside the Ring
In 1993 he made the movie Zapatos Viejos, where he starred alongside Gloria Trevi, playing "Ernesto". In 1995, he made his Hollywood acting debut in the low-budget movie Dirty Money.

Paez's name surfaced in the 2004 FBI investigation against promoter Bob Arum. The FBI was investigating whether Paez's win over Verdell Smith was a fixed fight or not.

Paez had a brief supporting role with World Wrestling Entertainment as an associate of Rey Mysterio, and accompanied him to the ring at the No Way Out pay-per-view event on February 15, 2004. Paez also appeared in Mysterio's music video for his song from the WWE Originals album, "Crossing Borders."

See also
Notable boxing families
List of featherweight boxing champions
List of IBF world champions
List of Mexican boxing world champions

References

External links

Boxers from Baja California
Sportspeople from Mexicali
International Boxing Federation champions
World Boxing Organization champions
Mexican male boxers
1965 births
Living people
Featherweight boxers